Yu Garden or Yuyuan Garden (Shanghainese Yuyoe , lit. Garden of Happiness) is an extensive Chinese garden located beside the City God Temple in the northeast of the Old City of Shanghai at Huangpu District, Shanghai. It abuts the Yuyuan Tourist Mart, the Huxinting Teahouse and the Yu Garden Bazaar.

This garden is accessible from the Shanghai Metro's Line 10 and Line 14 Yuyuan Garden station.

A centerpiece is the Exquisite Jade Rock a porous 3.3-m, 5-ton boulder. Rumours about its origin include the story that it was meant for the Huizong Emperor (Northern Song Dynasty from 1100 to 1126 AD) at the imperial garden in Bianjing,  but was salvaged from the Huangpu River after the boat carrying it had sunk.

History
Yu Garden was first built in 1559 during the Ming Dynasty by Pan Yunduan as a comfort for his father, the minister Pan En, in his old age. Pan Yunduan began the project after failing one of the imperial exams. He named the garden Yu Yuan, yu(豫) meaning "pleasing and satisfying to one's parents." His motivation to build this garden is to show filial piety to his parents and make them enjoy in their old age. Thus, Yu Garden is also known as "Garden of Peace and Comfort". However, Yunduan's appointment as governor of Sichuan postponed construction for nearly twenty years until 1577. 

In its original form, Yu Garden has many manufactured waterways, paths, rockeries, plants and buildings. The grounds were designed to be a complex of different gardens within one centre, Leshou Tang. From Pan's own records, the garden served as hub for many social activities when he lived there, and those events influenced the texture of Shanghai society. In particular, of Pan Yuduan's journal entries from 1586 through 1601, nearly three quarters of them are related to various public performances that were held in the garden, with the Leshou Tang being the main venue for these events.The garden was the largest and most prestigious of its era in Shanghai, but eventually its expense helped ruin the Pans.

The garden was later inherited by Zhang Zhaolin, Pan Yunduan's granddaughter's husband, and then passed to different owners. A section was briefly organised by Zhang Shengqu as the "Academy of Purity and Harmony" (Qīng-Hé Shūyuàn) and the Ling Yuan (Líng Yuàn, lit. "Spirit Park"), today's East Garden, was purchased by a group of local leaders in 1709. A group of merchants renovated the increasingly decrepit grounds in 1760 and in 1780 the West Garden was opened to the general public.

The gardens suffered damage numerous times during the 19th century. During the First Opium War, the British army used the Huxinting Teahouse as a base of operations for several days in 1842. During the Taiping Rebellion, the Small Swords Society ran its headquarters in the Dianchun Hall; by the time Qing troops recovered the garden, the original structures had nearly all been destroyed. They were damaged again by the Japanese in 1942 before being repaired by Liangshun Han (Rockery Han) appointed by the Shanghai government from 1956 to 1961. They were opened to the public in 1961 and declared a national monument in 1982.

Design

Today, Yu Garden occupies an area of 2 hectares (5 acres).The approach to the garden is across a Nine-turn bridge crossing a small pond with a teahouse. The entrance is off the forecourt at the end of the bridge. Yu Garden reflects the garden style of Jiangnan garden architecture in the Ming and Qing Dynasties. It perfectly blends decorative halls, elaborate pavilions, glittering ponds, zigzag bridges, archways, and exquisite rockeries.

Yu Garden is divided into six general areas laid out in the Suzhou style:
 Sansui Hall (Sān Suì Táng, lit. "Three Tassel Hall")includes the Grand Rockery (Dà Jiǎshān ), a 12-meter-high rockery made of huangshi stone, featuring peaks, cliffs, winding caves, and gorges. This scenery was possibly created by Zhang Nanyang during the Ming Dynasty.
 Wanhua Chamber (Wàn Huā Lóu, lit. "Chamber of the Ten Thousand Flowers")  includes Wanhua Chamber, Yule Pavilion, Double Lane Corridor and Gingko Tree of 400 years old staking out the front courtyard.
 Dianchun Hall (Diǎn Chūn Táng, lit. "Heralding Spring Hall")built in 1820, the first year of the Daoguang Emperor; served as the base of the Small Swords Society from September 1853 to February 1855
 Huijing Hall (Huì Jǐng Lóu) includes Jade Water Corridor, Three-Turn Bridge, Nine Lion Study.
 Yuhua Hall (Yù Huá Táng, lit. "Jade Magnificence Hall")furnished with rosewood pieces from the Ming Dynasty, shares its name with a mountain near Xinye in Zhejiang.
 Inner Garden (Nèi Yuán)rockeries, ponds, pavilions, and towers; first laid out in 1709 and more recently recreated in 1956 by combining its east and west gardens.

Each area is separated from the others by "dragon walls" with undulating gray tiled ridges, each terminating in a dragon's head.

Features

Surroundings and remark 
The garden is surrounded by city god temple and Yuyuan Bazaar. Yuyuan Bazaar is located right next to Yu Garden, with beautiful Chinese architecture and design coupled with hundreds of shops selling pieces of jewelry, silk, antiques, arts, crafts, souvenirs, and local snacks. Through out the years, Yu Garden has maintained a delicate balance between scholarly elegance and gaudy consumerism from its earliest days, and it has served as the stage on which the drama of the Pan family and the drama of the people of Shanghai have been performed.

Gallery

See also
 Classical Gardens of Suzhou
 List of Chinese gardens

References

External links

 

1577 establishments in China
Landmarks in Shanghai
Gardens in Shanghai
Major National Historical and Cultural Sites in Shanghai
Huangpu District, Shanghai